Piazza della Libertà is a city square in San Marino.

Buildings around the square
Palazzo Pubblico (San Marino)
Statua della Libertà

External links
 

Squares in San Marino
Geography of the City of San Marino